Nocturnal Butterfly is a 1941 Czech drama film directed by František Čáp based on a novel by Karel Novák. It was shown in 9th Venice Film Festival where it won a prize Targa di segnalazione.

The film was dubbed into German and released under the name Der Nachtfalter in 1943.

Cast
Hana Vítová as Marta Dekasová
Svatopluk Beneš as Lieutenant of King's Guard Rudolf Kala
Gustav Nezval as Senior lieutenant of King's Guard Varga
Marie Glázrová as Varga's wife Helena
Adina Mandlová as Prostitute Anča nicknamed Kiki
Rudolf Hrušínský as Student Michal Lary
Jaroslav Marvan as Marta's employer
Elena Hálková as Marta's employer
Renée Lavecká as Mášenka, their daughter
Marie Blažková as Housekeeper Katynka
Eduard Kohout as Mr. Leopold
Anna Steimarová as Madame from bar

Release
The movie was released online on YouTube  by Czech Film Archive on 16 February 2019.

References

External links 
 

1941 films
Czech drama films
1941 drama films
1940s Czech-language films
Films directed by František Čáp
Czech black-and-white films
Films set in Prague
Films about prostitution
1940s Czech films